Edward J. Donaghy was an American soccer referee active in the 1920s and 1930s. Donaghy is a member of the National Soccer Hall of Fame, and managed a number of important matches, such as the finals of the National Challenge Cup in 1930 and 1934, as well as three games in the 1934 FIFA World Cup qualification.

Donaghy had begun his career as a player in his native Scotland, before moving to America in 1911. Donaghy played soccer as in inside left between 1911 and 1919 for Tacony, Philadelphia Hibernian, Bethlehem Steel, Braddock, Homestead and Castle Shannon, before beginning his refereeing career in 1920.  He played for Bethlehem Steel from 1913 to early 1915.  He scored the winning goal for Bethlehem in the replay over Tacony in the 1914 American Cup.  In March 1915, Bethlehem Steel released him and he signed with Homestead F.C.

References

External links
Profile at National Soccer Hall of Fame
 Bethlehem Steel photo

Year of birth missing
Year of death missing
Sportspeople from Cambuslang
Scottish emigrants to the United States
American soccer players
American soccer referees
Bethlehem Steel F.C. (1907–1930) players
National Soccer Hall of Fame members
Disston A.A. players
Philadelphia Hibernian players
Scottish expatriate footballers
Scottish footballers
Expatriate soccer players in the United States
Association football inside forwards
Homestead F.C. players
Scottish expatriate sportspeople in the United States